Rodi Ermionis is a pomegranate, fruit of the Ermioni pomegranate tree, a local variety grown in the Ermionida area in the Peloponnese, Greece, which has been granted a Protected Designation of Origin designation.

Description	
The ripe fruit has a round shape with a thin, fleshy, elastic and shiny skin, with the inside having arils that contain a soft, medium-sized, semi-woody seed that breaks easily with chewing.  The color of the peel varies from pale yellow-pink to red (depending on the surface exposed to the sun) while the arils have a color that varies from pink to red. The Rodi Ermionis PDO can be applied to both the fresh fruit or to the hulled and packaged arils.

This type of pomegranate has been grown in Ermioni for decades. "The fruit is harvested very carefully and always manually, either using special secateurs or by hand, because 'Rodi Ermionis' has a soft, fine skin that is easily bruised. This reduces the risk of damage and post-harvest infestation and ensures fruit of a higher quality."

Production
Production of the fruit has increased in the 21st Century, from 4000 acres in 2007 to 10,000 in 2014 and is of great economic interest for the country.

References

 Pomegranates
Appellations
Rodi Ermionis